is an anime adaptation of the manga of the same name which was written by Hikaru Nakamura. The anime adaptation was announced in August 2009, and aired on TV Tokyo between April 4, 2010 and June 28, 2010. A second season, titled , aired in Japan between October 3, 2010 and December 26, 2010.

The first season was directed by Yukihiro Miyamoto and Akiyuki Shinbo, with series composition and screenplay writtten by Deko Akao, music composed by Masaru Yokoyama, and characters designed by Nobuhiro Sugiyama (Shaft). Sugiyama served as chief animation director for all of the episodes. About half of the series was co-produced with Diomedéa: episodes 2, 4, 6, 8, 11, and 13, which also had Kazuhisa Kosuge as a second chief animation director alongside Sugiyama. Five episodes were outsourced otherwise: episodes 3, 7, and 10 to Silver Link; episode 5 to Marvy Jack; and episode 8 to Studio Pastoral. The first season has three theme songs, two opening themes and one ending theme.. The opening theme was released as a single on May 26, 2010, and the ending theme on June 23, 2010. The opening theme for episode five is  performed by Miyuki Sawashiro.

The second season features  returning staff. However, Diomedéa is replaced as a partial co-producer by Marvy Jack in episodes 2, 4, 6, 8–9, and 12. Kosuge is also replaced as a second chief animation director by Kazuhiko Tamura. Seven episodes were outsourced otherwise: episodes 2 and 7 Diomedéa; episode 3 to White Fox; episodes 4, 7, and 11 to Tezuka Productions; and episode 8 to Magic Bus. The second season has three theme songs, two opening themes and one ending theme.

Arakawa Under the Bridge

Arakawa Under the Bridge x Bridge

Notes

References

Lists of anime episodes